Godel Iceport is an iceport about  wide, which marks a more-or-less permanent indentation in the seaward front of the extensive ice shelf fringing the coast of Queen Maud Land.

Discovery and naming
Godel Iceport was named by United States Navy Operation Deep Freeze I personnel on the USS Glacier (AGB-4), who made a running survey of this coast in March 1956, for  William H. Godel, deputy director of the Office of Special Operations, Department of the Navy, who assisted in formulating expedition plans and policy.

The term "iceport" was suggested by the Advisory Committee on Antarctic Names in 1956 to denote an ice shelf indentation, subject to configuration changes, which may offer anchorage or possible access to the upper surface of an ice shelf via ice ramps along one or more sides of the feature.

See also
 Ice pier
 Atka Iceport
 Erskine Iceport
 Norsel Iceport
 Bay of Whales

References

Ports and harbours of Queen Maud Land
Princess Ragnhild Coast